Ian Briggs (born 31 October 1958) is a British television writer, author and manager, whose work includes scripts for the BBC drama series Doctor Who and  Casualty.

Writing
Briggs wrote two serials for Doctor Who, Dragonfire and The Curse of Fenric, for the programme's 24th and 26th seasons respectively. Both stories featured Sylvester McCoy as the Seventh Doctor, while Dragonfire introduced Sophie Aldred as Ace. Briggs subsequently novelised both serials for the Target Books range.

In 1990, Briggs contributed the episodes "Street Life" to the fifth series of Casualty and "Old Wounds" to the sixth series of The Bill.

He has also contributed a short story, The Celestial Harmony Engine to the Doctor Who anthology Short Trips: Defining Patterns, published by Big Finish in March, 2008.

Other Work
Briggs has worked in theatre management and arts marketing in recent years.

References

External links

 
Biography of Ian Briggs at On Target

Living people
1958 births
British soap opera writers
British television writers
British science fiction writers
21st-century British short story writers
British male television writers
21st-century British screenwriters